Christian Harrison and Shintaro Mochizuki were the defending champions but only Harrison chose to defend his title, partnering Andrew Harris. Harrison successfully defended his title, defeating Luke Johnson and Sem Verbeek 7–6(8–6), 6–7(4–7), [10–8] in the final.

Seeds

Draw

References

External links
 Main draw

Tenerife Challenger III - Doubles